USS LST-287 was a  in the United States Navy during World War II. She was transferred to the Philippine Navy as RPS Samar Oriental (LT-502).

Construction and career 
LST-287 was laid down on 30 August 1943 at American Bridge Co., Ambridge, Pennsylvania. Launched on 31 October 1943 and commissioned on 15 December 1943.

Service in the United States Navy 
During World War II, LST-287 was assigned to the Europe-Africa-Middle East theater. She then participated in the Invasion of Normandy from 6 to 25 June 1944.

She was decommissioned on 13 June 1946.

Transferred to the Military Sea Transportation Service (MSTS), 29 May 1951, and placed in service as USNS T-LST-287.

LST-287 was struck from the Navy Register and transferred to the Philippines.

Service in the Philippine Navy 
She was acquired by the Philippine Navy on 13 September 1976 and renamed RPS Samar Oriental (LT-502).

On 19 April 1974, a 20 day marathon on bicycles named Tour of Luzon-Visayas with 200 participants boarded the ship at South Harbor in order to continue the marathon in Tolosa.

BRP Samar Oriental was moored at Poro Point, La Union, Luzon Island on 2 September 1991.

In 1992, BRP Ilocos Norte (LT-98), BRP Samar Oriental (LT-502), and BRP Tawi-Tawi (LT-512) were stricken.

Awards 
LST-287 have earned the following awards:

American Campaign Medal
Europe-Africa-Middle East Campaign Medal (1 battle star) 
World War II Victory Medal

Citations

Sources 
 
 
 
 

World War II amphibious warfare vessels of the United States
Ships built in Seneca, Illinois
1943 ships
LST-1-class tank landing ships of the United States Navy
LST-1-class tank landing ships of the Philippine Navy